Kronenberg is a village in the southeastern Netherlands. It is located in the municipality of Horst aan de Maas, Limburg, about 13 km northwest of Venlo.
There is a snackbar/take-away restaurant, De Kleine Chef, Americaanseweg 20 Kronenberg. 

In 1932, a parish was established in Kronenberg.

References

Populated places in Limburg (Netherlands)
Horst aan de Maas